Kowloon Tong is an area of Hong Kong located in Kowloon. The majority of the area is in the Kowloon City District. Its exact location is south of the Lion Rock, north of Boundary Street, east of the East Rail line and west of Grampian Road. It is one of the most expensive residential districts in Hong Kong.

It is popular among Hong Kong's wealthy residents because of its schools and low-density private housing. Most of the buildings there do not exceed 10 floors. In addition, this area is noted for its love hotels and nursing homes. Within Kowloon West, it is administratively divided between Kowloon City District and Sham Shui Po District, bisected by the Kowloon–Canton Railway.

History
Kowloon Tong was originally a small village located in present-day Police Sport Association near Boundary Street, south of Woh Chai Hill. The area allowed cultivation based on rivers running down from Beacon Hill.

At the time of the 1911 census, the population of Kowloon Tong was 185.

In the 1920s, the Hong Kong Government developed the area of east of Kowloon Tong and Kowloon Tsai on both sides of Kowloon–Canton Railway into a low density residential area (based on British town planning of the time). The residential area is thus known as Kowloon Tong. The area's roads and streets are largely named after counties in England. It was the home of a large number of wealthy English businessmen.

The name of Kowloon Tsai is preserved in the hill west of the former village of Kowloon Tsai. Kowloon Tong is notoriously remembered as the site of martial artist Bruce Lee's death on Friday, July 20, 1973.

Landmarks

Notable landmarks in Kowloon Tong include:
 Beacon Hill — a hill with a height of 457 m, and several residential developments.
 Festival Walk — a large shopping centre operated by Swire Group and CITIC, now owned by Singaporean investment firm Mapletree.
 Broadcast Drive — a road where all of Hong Kong's free-to-air TV stations (TVB, ATV), Hong Kong's oldest radio station (Radio Television Hong Kong), and Commercial Radio Hong Kong are headquartered.
 St. Teresa's Church
 41 Cumberland Road, Bruce Lee's former home in Hong Kong. Demolished in 2019.

Media
The two biggest radio companies in Hong Kong, Commercial Radio Hong Kong and Radio Television Hong Kong, are both located on Broadcast Drive, Kowloon Tong. Minibus route 29A serves Broadcast Drive from MTR Kowloon Tong station.

Education

The Hong Kong Baptist University and the City University of Hong Kong are located in Kowloon Tong. Many leading local English medium of instruction (EMI) primary and secondary schools on the Kowloon peninsula are located in the area, including Kowloon True Light Middle School, Kowloon Tong School (Secondary Section), Maryknoll Convent School, La Salle College and the Beacon Hill School. Other well known international schools in the area include the American International School, Yew Chung International School, Concordia International School, Australian International School, and the Delia School of Canada.

Kowloon Tong is in Primary One Admission (POA) School Net 41. Within the school net are multiple aided schools (operated independently but funded with government money) and Kowloon Tong Government Primary School.

Schools
Kindergarten
 Kentville Kindergarten
 St. Nicolas English Kindergarten
York International Kindergarten
 Tutor Time International Nursery & Kindergarten
SDM-Chatsworth International Kindergarten

International schools
American International School Hong Kong
Australian International School Hong Kong
Yew Chung International School
Primary schools
Alliance Primary School, Kowloon Tong
Kowloon Tong Government Primary School
Kowloon Tong School (Primary School)
Kingston International School
Secondary schools
Holy Family Canossian School
Kowloon True Light Middle School
Kowloon Tong School (Secondary Section)
United Christian College (Kowloon East)

Transport
Kowloon Tong is served by the MTR's East Rail line and Kwun Tong line at Kowloon Tong station. Passengers may change here between the two lines. The stretch of Waterloo Road through Kowloon Tong forms part of Hong Kong's Route 1. It leads into the Lion Rock Tunnel, and as such serves as an important artery for traffic heading into and out of the New Territories (in particular Sha Tin). Yau Ma Tei is also accessible via Waterloo Road.

Streets
Streets in Kowloon Tong include:
 Boundary Street, partially in Kowloon Tong
 Waterloo Road, partially in Kowloon Tong
 York Road (see also Henry Tang illegal basement controversy)

See also
List of places in Hong Kong
Kowloon City
Mong Kok
 Yau Yat Tsuen

References

External links

 Kowloon Tong Garden Estate (c.1922- ) on gwulo.com
 Kowloon Tong Garden City Estate on docomomo.hk
 

 
New Kowloon